Kshitij Patwardhan (born 11 January 1985) is an Indian screenwriter, theatre director, playwright, and lyricist. He received Filmfare award for best screenplay in 2018, Filmfare award for best lyrics in 2020, along with the prestigious Tarun tejankit award 2019. He is also the recipient of multiple  Maharashtra state awards, zee gaurav, MIFTA and Star pravah Ratna for his outstanding contribution to Marathi cinema.

Early life 
Kshitij Patwardhan was born in Pune to a Maharashtrian family and completed his education at Bharat Marathi Vidyalaya and Abhinav Marathi Vidyalaya. He started writing during his school days and won many prizes in inter-school competitions.

After pursuing a Bachelor of Computer Science and Master's degree in communication and journalism, he developed an avid interest in writing. While working with Setu Advertising in Pune, he earned a United Nations Population Fund (UNFPA)–Laadli National Award for Creative Excellence for Social Change for copy writing a print advertisement about stopping sex selection He won this award again for a Hindi song that he wrote.

Theatre 
Kshitij Patwardhan's first Marathi commercial play, Nava Gadi Nava Rajya, became a hit among youth audience. It ran for 475 shows and earned more than 25 awards.

In 2015, he adapted a short story by Hanumant Moreshwar Marathe into the play Don Special; the play became a modern classic of Marathi theatre.It had a successful run of 225 shows and was awarded more than 30 awards.

Films 
Kshitij Patwardhan's first film was the 2010 Aaghat which he wrote with Sameer Vidwans. He then wrote the dialogue of the youth-centric film Satrangi Re with Hemant Dhome.

He penned romantic comedies like Time Please, Lagna Pahave Karun and Timepass 2. He wrote the screenplay for Classmates released in 2015. The same year, the film Double Seat which he conceptualized and wrote was released. It went on to become one of the most successful Marathi films of 2015.

In 2016 he wrote the coming of an age Marathi film called YZ, which was praised by critics. In 2017 he, along with director Aditya Sarpotdar, created the first Marathi teenage detective film called Faster Fene. In July 2018 it was announced that his latest project, Riteish Deshmukh's action drama Mauli, was to be released in December.

Songs 
Kshitij Patwardhan has written more than 80 songs for approximately 30 Marathi films including chart buster numbers like "Dhaga Dhaga" from Daagdi Chaawl,"Awaz vadav DJ" from Poshter Girl,"Mohini" from Double Seat,"Mana shevantiche Phoo" from Baapjanma, "Chalu Chal" and "Rubab Pahije" from Half Ticket.

Advertising 
He has written multiple campaigns for popular Marathi brands.His work includes the campaigns for Pro Kabaddi League 2015 and 2017.

Publishing 
In 2017 he produced and published an illustrated novel in Marathi called Darya. It was written by his brother Vikram Patwardhan.

Filmography

As screenwriter

As lyricist

Awards

References

External links 
 
 

1985 births
Living people
Indian lyricists
Indian publishers (people)
Marathi screenwriters
Screenwriters from Maharashtra